Franco Lechner, best known as Bombolo (22 May 1931 – 21 August 1987), was an Italian character actor and comedian.

Life and career 
Born in Rome into a humble family, a former peddler of dishes, Lechner was discovered in a tavern by Franco Castellacci and Pierfrancesco Pingitore, who entered him in their cabaret company "Il Bagaglino". He got a large popularity in cinema as the sidekick of Tomas Milian in a successful series of half-serious poliziottesco films directed by Bruno Corbucci. He was also partner of Enzo Cannavale in a number of comedy films. He died at age 56 as a result of complications following a major surgical operation. Decades later, his characteristic slang, and particularly his distinctive "tze tze", remain popular among the younger generations.

Partial filmography 

 Remo e Romolo (Storia di due figli di una lupa) (1976) - Pappo
 La prima notte di nozze (1976)
 Hit Squad (1976) - Er Trippa
 Nerone (1977) - Roscio
 Il marito in collegio (1977) - Killer
 Messalina, Messalina (1977) - Zenturio Bisone
 Squadra antitruffa (1977) - Franco 'Venticello' Bertarelli
 Little Italy (1978) - Venticello
 Scherzi da prete (1978) - Bombolo
 Assassinio sul Tevere (1979) - Franco 'Venticello' Bertarelli
 Tutti a squola (1979) - Bombolo il bidello
 L'imbranato (1979) - Bombolo, il genero
 Ciao marziano (1980) - Pietro
 La settimana bianca (1980) - Giulio Cesare
 Delitto a Porta Romana (1980) - Franco 'Venticello' Bertarelli
 Il casinista (1980) - Poldo
 L'amante tutta da scoprire (1981) - Bombolo
 La settimana al mare (1981) - Orazio Canestrari
 Uno contro l'altro, praticamente amici (1981) - Capoccione
 I carabbinieri (1981) - Mozzarella
 Una vacanza del cactus (1981) - Augusto Squarciarelli
 Crime at the Chinese Restaurant (1981) - Bombolo
 Miracoloni (1981) - Taxista
 Il marito in vacanza (1981) - Agenore
 W la foca (1982) - Doctor Filippo Patacchiola
 Attenti a quei P2 (1982) - Bombolo il portiere
 Il sommergibile più pazzo del mondo (1982) - Il Postino
 Delitto sull'autostrada (1982) - Venticello
 Sturmtruppen 2 (tutti al fronte) (1982)
 La sai l'ultima sui matti? (1982) - Caciotta
 È forte un casino! (1982) - Cicciobello
 Un jeans e una maglietta (1983)
 Sfrattato cerca casa equo canone (1983) - Maciste
 La discoteca (1983) - Bombolo
 Crime in Formula One (1984) - Venticello
 Cop in Drag (1984) - Franco 'Venticello' Bertarelli
 Vacanze d'estate (1985) - Cardinale
 Giuro che ti amo (1986) - (final film role)

References

External links 
 

Italian male film actors
1931 births
1987 deaths
Italian male stage actors
20th-century Italian male actors
Male actors from Rome
Italian male comedians
20th-century Italian comedians
Burials at the Cimitero Flaminio